The NRG Center (former name Reliant Center) is a convention center in Houston, Texas, United States. It is part of the NRG Park complex that was constructed around the NRG Astrodome and NRG Stadium. The NRG Center hosts various events year-round, including portions of the Houston Livestock Show and Rodeo, who maintains its offices on the second floor of the building. The grand opening of the facility was on April 12, 2002, with the Houston Auto Show. Hermes Reed Architects was the architect for the facility.

On March 12, 2014, the Reliant Center was renamed to the NRG Center.

The facility 

Each meeting room has its own dedicated sound, lighting and networking capabilities.

The facility the technological infrastructure capable of providing high-speed internet access, pre-wired fiber optic cabling backbone, on-site production facilities, 120 television monitors, as well as web-casting abilities.

Uses
Along with the Houston Livestock Show and Rodeo, NRG Center hosts some of the largest conventions and trade shows in Houston. Some examples of these events are the Offshore Technology Conference, The Reliant Park World Series of Dog Shows, Nutcracker Market, Houston Auto Show, International Gem & Jewelry Show, The Vans Warped Tour, Houston Gun Collector's and Antique Show, and the Houston Boat, Sport, and Travel Show, to name a few.

In September 2005, the center hosted several thousand refugees from Hurricane Katrina when the Astrodome was declared full.

Reliant Center hosted World Wrestling Entertainment's WrestleMania Axxess event from April 2 to April 5, in 2009, where fans met their favorite wrestlers in the buildup to WrestleMania XXV at the NRG Stadium on April 5.

On 30 August 2017, the NRG Center again became a relief shelter in the aftermath of Hurricane Harvey, after the George R. Brown Convention Center went over capacity.

OTC 
From 2003, the Offshore Technology Conference is held at the NRG Center.  The OTC is a large event in the technology of offshore exploration and production of energy resources and associated environmental protection, with attendance in tens of thousands attendees.

References 

 
 

Event venues established in 2002
Buildings and structures in Houston
Tourist attractions in Houston
2002 establishments in Texas